Geir Arne Olsen (1957 - 1990), better known under his pen-name Leonard Borgzinner, was a Norwegian essayist, self-taught political philosopher, science fiction author, illustrator and fanzine editor. Borgzinner is most noted for his many contributions to the alternative culture magazine Gateavisa and for his two books, a collection of science fiction and fantasy stories, Universets varmedød og andre selvmord (1981; "The Heat-Death of the Universe and other Suicides") and a collection of essays in political philosophy, Anarki og adel: elementer til en kulturrevolusjon (1998; "Anarchy and Nobility: Elements towards a Cultural Revolution"). As an illustrator he was known for his often satirical drawings for fanzines and underground publications, including some comic strips. His fanzine production in the late 1970s, still partly under the name of Geir Arne Olsen, spanned both science fiction fandom and the punk music world, the former in the fanzines TRALFA and The Borgzinner Medicine Show, and the latter most notably in the two published issues of 666, published in opposition to the Norwegian punk establishment. Influences on his work included Pre-Socratic philosophy, Marquis de Sade, anarchism, Friedrich Nietzsche, William S. Burroughs, new wave science fiction, Samuel R. Delany, Yukio Mishima and Michel Foucault.

He has been translated into French. His alternative, punk era pen-name Leon Latex was used as the name of a character in a television series for children made by the leftist Norwegian theatre group Tramteatret in the early 1980s.

Leonard Borgzinner, 1957-1990: A short tribute in Norwegian by social anthropologist Thomas Hylland Eriksen.

References

1957 births
1990 deaths
Anarchist theorists
Anarchist writers
Norwegian science fiction writers
Political philosophers
Norwegian anarchists
20th-century Norwegian writers